Wes Hurley is a Russian-American writer and filmmaker. He has collaborated with many theater, drag, and cabaret performers in Seattle and raised awareness of human rights violations in Russia.

Early life and education
Born and raised in Vladivostok, Russian SFSR, Soviet Union (present-day Vladivostok, Russia), Hurley moved to Seattle in the 1990s at the age of 16 with his mother when she married an American.

Career
Hurley's films, many with gay themes, include Waxie Moon, Waxie Moon in Fallen Jewel, Zolushka, Rusalka, and the web and later TV series Capitol Hill, which premiered in 2014.

He has also collaborated with theater, cabaret, and drag performers including Waxie Moon, Sarah Rudinoff, Jinkx Monsoon, BenDeLaCreme, and Jackie Hell, and raised awareness of human rights violations in Russia.

In 2020, Hurley filmed "Potato Dreams of America" - a dark autobiographical comedy starring Dan Lauria, Lea DeLaria, Jonathan Bennett, Sera Barbieri, Tyler Bocock, Marya Sea Kaminsky, Hersh Powers, Lady Rizo, Sophia Mitry Schloss and Lauren Tewes. The film premiered at SXSW on March 16, 2021.

Hurley has been a regular contributor to Huffington Post.

Private life
Hurley realized he was gay before leaving Russia; he came out to his mother when he was 16. His autobiographical film Little Potato, co-directed by Nathan Miller, tells the story of their migration, his adolescence, and his mother's relationship with her spouse, who ultimately came out as transgender.

Honors
In 2013 Hurley was chosen as one of the Artists of the Year by City Arts magazine, along with Megan Griffiths, Macklemore, Ryan Lewis, and Jinkx Monsoon. He was chosen as a Person to Watch in 2015 by The Advocate. In 2019 he won a Creative Capital grant. Little Potato won over two dozen awards from around the world including Jury Awards at South by Southwest, Oslo Fusion, Sarasota Film Festival, Annapolis Film Festival, USA Film Festival and Audience Awards at Outfest, Ashland Independent Film Festival and Mardi Gras Film Festival.  Little Potato had its online premiere on Topic and was later picked up by The Atlantic. The short is also a Vimeo Staff pick, was short-listed by The Wrap and nominated for Best Short by Cinema Eye Honors.  The companion VR piece ''Potato Dreams premiered at American Film Institute Film Festival and International Documentary Film Festival Amsterdam.

References

External links

Living people
American film directors
American film producers
American television producers
Gay entertainers
Gay screenwriters
Year of birth missing (living people)
LGBT film directors
Russian LGBT entertainers
Soviet emigrants to the United States
Russian LGBT screenwriters
LGBT people from Washington (state)
Filmmakers from Seattle
People from Seattle